Manëz or Manzë is a town and a former municipality in the Durrës County, western Albania. At the 2015 local government reform it became a subdivision of the municipality Durrës. The population at the 2011 census was 6,652.

The town is known for the headquarters for the exiled Iranian Shiite Islamist-Marxist political group, the People's Mujahedin of Iran (PMOI/MEK) which their compound is designated as Camp Ashraf.

Manëza -> Kuçok,Manëz e Vjetër,Armath,Radë,Hamallaj,Kamerras,Shkallë.

See also
People's Mojahedin Organization of Iran#Settlement in Albania (2016–present)

References

Administrative units of Durrës
Former municipalities in Durrës County
Towns in Albania
Populated places disestablished in 2015